Ed Lynskey is an American poet, critic, and novelist, mostly of crime fiction. He was born in 1956 in Washington, D.C. where he still lives and works.  He writes five mystery series, including the P.I. Frank Johnson Mystery Series, the Isabel & Alma Trumbo Cozy Mystery Series, the Piper & Bill Robin Cozy Mystery Series, the Hope Jones (Nozy Cat) Cozy Mystery Series, the Ginny Dove Cozy Mystery Series, and the Juno Patchen Cozy Mystery Series.

His creative work has been reviewed in Publishers Weekly, Booklist, Library Journal, Ellery Queen Mystery Magazine, San Diego Union-Tribune, London Free Press, Halifax Chronicle-Herald, Lansing State Journal, The Virginian-Pilot, Tucson Citizen, and Nashville City Paper. Lynskey's work has been favorably compared to that of Loren D. Estleman, James Lee Burke, Daniel Woodrell, Bill Pronzini, and Robert Crais.

His essays have been reprinted by Gale Research and Gryphon Books. He has written reviews for The New York Times, The Washington Post, San Francisco Chronicle, Chicago Sun-Times, Kansas City Star, Atlanta Journal-Constitution, Roanoke Times, Des Moines Register, The Plain Dealer (Cleveland, Ohio), and Columbus Dispatch. His speculative literature has appeared in Strange Horizons, Chizine, and Alfred Hitchcock Mystery Magazine.

His numerous poems have appeared in such venues as The Atlantic Monthly, American Poetry Review, and Chicago Review. He won the 1993 Denny C. Plattner Appalachian Heritage Award in Poetry from Berea College, Kentucky. His work has been anthologized by St. Martin’s Press, University of Virginia Press, Kent State University Press, and Storyline Press.

His poem "April Sashays in Lime Heels" received an Honorable Mention in The Year's Best Fantasy and Horror 2007: 20th Annual Collection, Ellen Datlow, editor. His stories were cited in Hardcore Hardboiled, Todd Robinson, Otto Penzler, editors, Kensington Publishing Group, 2008 and Sex, Thugs, Rock & Roll, Todd Robinson, editor, Kensington Publishing Group, 2009.

Bibliography

Novels
Private Investigator Frank Johnson Mystery series
 The Dirt-Brown Derby (2006)
 The Blue Cheer (2007)
 Pelham Fell Here (2008) - (actually first novel in series published out of sequence)
 Troglodytes (2010) 
 The Zinc Zoo (2011) 
 After the Big Noise (2014)
 Death Car (2021)
Bent Halo (2022)
Clover (2022)
Fluke (2023)
Quarry (2023)
Forge (2023)

Isabel and Alma Trumbo Cozy Mystery Series
Quiet Anchorage (2011)
The Cashmere Shroud (2013)
The Ladybug Song (2014)
The Amber Top Hat (2015) 
Sweet Betsy (2015)
Murder in a One-Hearse Town (2016)
Vi's Ring (2017)
Heirloom (2017)
A Big Dill (2018)
Eve's Win (2019)
To Dye For (2021)
Fowl Play (2022)

Robin and Bill Piper Cozy Mystery Series
The Corpse Wore Gingham (2015)
Fur the Win (2016)

Juno Patchen Cozy Mystery Series
Berried Truths (2020)

Hope Jones Cozy Mystery Series (written under the pseudonym Lyn Key)
Nozy Cat 1 (2016)
Nozy Cat 2 (2017)
Nozy Cat 3 (2018)
Nozy Cat 4 (2019)

Ginny Dove Cozy Mystery Series (written under the pseudonym Lea Charles)
Found Key (2018)
Easy Peasy (2021)

Stand Alone Novels
 Lake Charles (2011, republished 2018) - Appalachian noir title
 Ask the Dice (2011) - hit man noir title
 Blood Diamonds (2012) - diamond heist title
 The Quetzal Motel (2012) - science fiction title
 Topaz Moon (2014) - suburban noir title
Wrong Orbits (2015) - suburban noir title
Cops Like Us (2020) - police novel set in Washington, D.C.

Short story collections
 Out of Town a Few Days (2004) 
 A Clear Path to Cross (2008)
 Smoking on Mount Rushmore (2013)

Continuing characters
 Frank Johnson - Private detective living in Pelham, Virginia.
 Isabel & Alma Trumbo - Sister sleuths living in Quiet Anchorage, Virginia.
 Piper & Bill Robins - Married couple sleuths living in Beverly Park, Virginia.
 Hope Jones - Single mother and sleuth living with her daughter Stacey in Sweet Springs, Virginia.
 Ginny Dove - Single mother and sleuth living with her son Boone in Canaan, Virginia.
 Juno Patchen - Single mother and sleuth living with her son Chip in Cat's Paw, Virginia.

External links
 

 Ed Lynskey's GoodReads Author Page
 The Blue Cheer
 William G. Contento's "The FictionMags Index's" List of short stories and articles by Ed Lynskey 
 Announcement for 1993 Denny C. Plattner Appalachian Heritage Awards, First Place, Poetry, Ed Lynskey

Sex, Thugs, and Rock & Roll story citation.
 Author interview at Writer Unboxed, August 3, 2007, with Kathleen Bolton.
 Locus Index for Science Fiction list of short stories by Ed Lynskey
2007 Starred Review in Booklist for The Blue Cheer.

American crime fiction writers
Living people
American male poets
Writers from Washington, D.C.
American male novelists
Year of birth missing (living people)